Zilda Arns Neumann (August 25, 1934 – January 12, 2010) was a Brazilian pediatrician and aid worker.

A sister of Cardinal Dom Paulo Evaristo Arns, the former Archbishop of São Paulo known for his efforts against the Brazilian military dictatorship, Zilda Arns became internationally known by founding a Catholic pastoral care for poor children. Her humanitarian work, which also included the poor and the elderly, spanned over three decades.

Arns died on January 12, 2010, as a result of the 2010 Haiti earthquake. Five years after her death, the Archdiocese of São Paulo formally launched a diocesan investigation, opening the way to canonization and recognition of her status as a saint.

Early life and education
Born in the rural town of Forquilhinha, Arns was one of the 13 children of Gabriel Arns (1890–1965) and Helene Arns (née Steiner) (1894–1974). She was the aunt of Senator Flávio Arns.

Two of Arns' memories were of seeing her father go door-to-door on his horse to help contain a smallpox epidemic and watching her mother arrange for a sick neighbour to be taken to the nearest hospital on the back of a cart, a journey of three hours. Those acts inspired her contemplate life as a doctor, even  most of her priests or teachers.

Having studied medicine, she graduated from university in 1959, UFPR - Federal University of Paraná. Arns further studied public health, with the aim of assisting poor children in environments plagued with high child mortality rates, malnutrition and violence.

Career
After she worked in local hospitals tending to infants, she was then given charge of a string of clinics on the impoverished outskirts of the southern city of Curitiba.

Arns was the founder coordinator of Pastoral da Criança (Pastoral Care for Children), an organ for social action of the National Conference of Bishops of Brazil. The Care for Children has one of the largest programs in the world devoted to child health and nutrition. The pro has about 260,000 volunteers and has reduced infant mortality by more than half in over 31,000 urban and rural communities of intense poverty.

Arns also coordinated Pastoral da Pessoa Idosa (Pastoral Care for Elderly Persons), and social action organisms of the Episcopal Conference of Brazil.

As a Catholic, Arns condemned contraception. Her approach was based on familial education in order to help decrease the rates of petty crime and preventable diseases.

Personal life

Widowed since 1978, she was a mother of five and grandmother of nine.  
Arns was killed by the Haiti earthquake of 12 January 2010 in Port-au-Prince, where she was carrying out humanitarian activities on behalf of Pastoral da Criança. She was struck in the head by falling debris from the roof of a church in which she had just given a speech. She was 75 years old at the time. Brazilian President Luiz Inacio Lula da Silva attended her funeral.

Awards and honours
She was awarded with several honorary citizen titles throughout Brazil. She was also recognized as a Public Health Heroe by Pan American Health Organization

See also
Joseph Serge Miot
Sam Dixon (Methodist)
Casualties of the 2010 Haiti earthquake

References

External links

 Zilda Arns – The Daily Telegraph obituary
 Aftermath

1934 births
2010 deaths
Brazilian people of German descent
Federal University of Paraná alumni
Brazilian women physicians
Brazilian Servants of God
21st-century venerated Christians
Brazilian humanitarians
Brazilian pediatricians
People from Santa Catarina (state)
Victims of the 2010 Haiti earthquake
20th-century Brazilian physicians
21st-century Brazilian physicians